The British Ambassador to Germany is the United Kingdom's foremost diplomatic representative in the Federal Republic of Germany, and in charge of the UK's diplomatic mission in Germany.  The official title is His Britannic Majesty's Ambassador to the Federal Republic of Germany.

History
On German unification in 1871 the British Ambassador to the Kingdom of Prussia/North German Confederation in Berlin became the Ambassador to the new German Empire.  During the partition of Germany following World War II the Ambassador to the new Federal Republic (or West Germany) resided in Bonn, the capital, from 1952.  Berlin once more became the capital at reunification in 1990 and the Ambassador returned to Berlin in a new Embassy building, on the exact site of its predecessor in the Wilhelmstrasse, in 2000.

This article also includes the following predecessors:
German Confederation, whose Diet was at Frankfurt.
North German Confederation.

For envoys to the:
 Holy Roman Emperor see Austria.
 Imperial Diet at Ratisbon see Bavaria.
 Imperial Court at Brussels see Belgium.

 Elector of Cologne at Cologne and then Bonn see Cologne
 Electorate of Hanover and then Kingdom of Hanover at Hanover see Hanover
 Hanseatic cities of Bremen, Hamburg and Lübeck see Hanseatic Cities
 Landgraviate of Hesse-Kassel and then Electorate of Hesse at Darmstadt see Hesse-Cassel
 Elector of Brandenburg and to the Kingdom of Prussia at Berlin see Prussia
 Electorate of Saxony at Dresden see Saxony
 Kingdom of Württemberg at Stuttgart see Württemberg 
 Other German States see other German states

List of heads of mission

German Confederation

Envoys Extraordinary and Ministers Plenipotentiary
1817–1824: Hon. Frederick Lamb
1824–1827: Hon. Frederick Cathcart
1826–1828: John Ralph Milbanke Chargé d'Affaires (Legation secretary 1826–1835)
1828–1829: Henry Addington
1829–1830: George Chad
1830–1838: Thomas Cartwright
1838: Hon. Henry Fox
1838–1839: Ralph Abercromby
1840–1848: Hon. William Fox-Strangways
1848–1852: Henry Wellesley, 2nd Baron Cowley Special Mission 1849-1851
1852–1866: Sir Alexander Malet, 2nd Baronet
German Confederation dissolved 1866

North German Confederation

Ambassador Extraordinary and Plenipotentiary
1868–1871: Lord Augustus Loftus (previously ambassador to Prussia, 1866-1868)
North German Confederation becomes German Empire 1870-71

German Empire

Ambassadors Extraordinary and Plenipotentiary
1871–1884: Lord Odo Russell (created 1st Baron Ampthill in 1881)
1884–1895: Sir Edward Malet
1895–1908: Sir Frank Lascelles
1908–1914: Sir Edward Goschen
No representation 1914–1919 due to World War I—US diplomats mainly took care of duties during this time

Weimar Republic

Chiefs of the Military Mission to Berlin
1919: Gordon Macready
1919–1920: Neill Malcolm

Ambassadors Extraordinary and Plenipotentiary
1920: Victor Hay (later 21st Earl of Errol) Chargé d'Affaires
1920–1926: Lord D'Abernon (created 1st Viscount D'Abernon in 1926)
1926–1928: The Hon Sir Ronald Lindsay
1928–1933: Sir Horace Rumbold

Third Reich

Ambassadors Extraordinary and Plenipotentiary
1933–1937: Sir Eric Phipps
1937–1939: Sir Nevile Meyrick Henderson

World War II and after
No representation 1939–1944 due to World War II
Post-war government of Germany 1944–1948 by Allied Control Council

West Germany

High Commissioner at Allied High Commission
1949–1950: Sir Brian Robertson (later 1st Baron Robertson of Oakridge)
1950–1953: Sir Ivone Kirkpatrick
1953–1955: Sir Frederick Hoyer Millar (later 1st Baron Inchyra)

Ambassadors Extraordinary and Plenipotentiary
1955–1957: Sir Frederick Hoyer Millar (later 1st Baron Inchyra)
1957–1962: Sir Christopher Steel
1962–1968: Sir Frank Roberts
1968–1972: Sir Roger Jackling
1972–1975: Sir Nicholas Henderson
1975–1981: Sir Oliver Wright
1981–1984: Sir Jock Taylor
1984–1988: Sir Julian Bullard
1988–1990: Sir Christopher Mallaby

East Germany

Ambassadors Extraordinary and Plenipotentiary
1974–1976: Sir Curtis Keeble
1976–1978: Sir Percy Cradock
1978–1981: 
1981–1984: Peter Maxey
1984–1988: 
1988–1990: Sir Nigel Broomfield
1990:

Germany

Ambassadors Extraordinary and Plenipotentiary
1990–1993: Sir Christopher Mallaby
1993–1997: Sir Nigel Broomfield
1997: Christopher Meyer (later Sir Christopher Meyer)
1997–2003: Sir Paul Lever
2003–2007: Sir Peter Torry
2007–2010: Sir Michael Arthur
2010–2015: Sir Simon McDonald
2015–2020: Sir Sebastian Wood

2020–present: Jill Gallard

References

External links
UK and Germany, gov.uk

Germany
 
United Kingdom